Reading Nunnery was a nunnery in Berkshire, England that existed during the Anglo-Saxon period.

It was established in 979. The site is now occupied by St Mary's Church.

References

Monasteries in Berkshire
Anglo-Saxon monastic houses
979 establishments
Buildings and structures in Reading, Berkshire
10th-century establishments in England
Nunneries in England
Christian monasteries established in the 10th century